Joseph Gerard Sullivan (born August 9, 1944) is an American diplomat who was a career minister in the Senior Foreign Service. He served as the U.S. Ambassador to Zimbabwe (2001–2004) and Angola (1998–2001).  He was also Principal Officer in Cuba from 1993 to 1996. He was nominated to be Ambassador to Nicaragua but his nomination was not acted upon by the Senate.

Sullivan was born in Boston, Massachusetts in August 1944. He lived in the Neponset section of Dorchester, Boston until he was ten years old, when the family moved to the nearby St. Ann's parish. In seventh grade, he started attending the Boston Latin School.

Sullivan earned an M.A. degree in government from Georgetown University and a B.A. degree from Tufts University (class of 1966).

References

1944 births
Living people
20th-century American diplomats
21st-century American diplomats
Boston Latin School alumni
Georgetown University Graduate School of Arts and Sciences alumni
Tufts University alumni
United States Public Health Service personnel
People from Dorchester, Massachusetts
United States Foreign Service personnel
Ambassadors of the United States to Angola
Ambassadors of the United States to Zimbabwe